Rodrigo Santoni (born October 19, 1981) is an Argentine footballer who most recently played for Arema Indonesia in the Indonesia Super League.

References

External links

1981 births
Association football forwards
Argentine expatriate footballers
Argentine expatriate sportspeople in Indonesia
Argentine footballers
Expatriate footballers in Indonesia
Liga 1 (Indonesia) players
Living people
Persikabo Bogor players
Persikab Bandung players
PSIS Semarang players
Arema F.C. players